Chef'Special is a Dutch indie pop band from Haarlem, the Netherlands. Chef'Special's lineup consists of lead vocalist Joshua Nolet, guitarist Guido Joseph, bass player Jan Derks, keyboard player Wouter Heeren and drummer Wouter Jerry Prudon. They have released three albums and three EPs since their formation in 2008. They became known in the Netherlands for being house band for the popular Dutch TV program "De Wereld Draait Door" in 2011.
In 2015 the band went on its first US tour as support act for indie band Aer. They have joined Twenty One Pilots on their Emotional Roadshow World Tour as an opening act in the summer of 2016, alongside Mutemath.

In February 2016 the band's song "In Your Arms" charted at position 40 in Billboard's Alternative Songs chart.

The band became War Child ambassadors in November 2020, for the 160 million children growing up in conflict. Chef’Special joined forces with jewellery designer Bas Verdonk to design a fundraising charm for the War Child Bracelet – which contains links made from the melted down steel from an AK-47 machine gun.

Band member Joshua Nolet was one of the contestants in the twenty-first season of the Dutch television series Wie is de Mol? (Who is the Mole?).

Band members
Jan Derks – bass guitar, vocals, percussion 
Guido "G" Joseph – guitars, samples, backing vocals 
Wouter "Dub" Heeren – keyboards, synthesizers, organs, melodica, backing vocals 
Joshua Nolet – lead vocals 
Wouter Jerry Prudon – drums, percussion

Discography

Studio albums

Extended plays

Singles

*Tip means the release did not chart on the Dutch Top 40, but appeared on the Tipparade for "bubbling under" hits

References

Musical groups from North Holland
Musical groups established in 2008